Justin Richard Hobday (born 12 August 1963) is a South African professional golfer who has won eleven official money events on the Sunshine Tour.

Hobday was born in Bishops Stortford, Hertfordshire, England, and is the nephew of golfer Simon Hobday, twice winner on the European Tour.

Hobday turned professional in 1985 and joined the Southern Africa Tour, now the Sunshine Tour. He was awarded the Bobby Locke Trophy as the Rookie of the Year in 1986, and went on to win his first event in 1989. He would win ten more tournaments official money events on the tour between then and 2001.

Between 1987 and 2002, Hobday competed also on the European Tour, where he had a best finish of 92nd place on the Order of Merit in 1992, with a tournament best of third in the Peugeot Spanish Open that same year.

Amateur highlights
1983/84 Earned Amateur Springbok Colours 4 times
1984/85 Member of SA amateur team

Professional wins (13)

Sunshine Tour wins (11)
1989 Lombard Tyres Classic
1991 Goodyear Classic, PX Celebrity Pro-am (tied with Chris Williams), Chipkin Catering Supply Sun City Pro-Am (tied with Des Terblanche)
1993 Spoornet Classic, Sun City Classic
1995 FNB Pro Series: Free State
1996 IDC Development Classic
1998 FNB Botswana Open, Royal Swazi Sun Classic
2001 Bearing Man Highveld Classic

Other Southern Africa wins (2)
1995 Bloemfontein Classic
1999 Royal Swazi Sun Touring Pros Pro-Am

See also
List of African golfers

External links

South African male golfers
European Tour golfers
Sunshine Tour golfers
People from Bishop's Stortford
Sportspeople from Pretoria
1963 births
Living people